Propebela tayensis is a species of sea snail, a marine gastropod mollusk in the family Mangeliidae.

Distribution
This species occurs in the Japan Sea at a depth of  150 m; fossil records were also found.

References

tayensis
Gastropods described in 1938